Hurleston is a civil parish in Cheshire East, England. It contains eight buildings that are recorded in the National Heritage List for England as designated listed buildings, all of which are at Grade II. This grade is the lowest of the three gradings given to listed buildings and is applied to "buildings of national importance and special interest". The parish is entirely rural, its main feature being the junction of the Shropshire Union Canal and the Llangollen Canal, the Hurleston Junction, and in particular the system of locks at the east end of the Llangollen Canal. Of the eight listed buildings, six are associated with the canal system, four locks and two bridges. The other listed buildings are a farmhouse and one of its farm buildings.

See also

 Listed buildings in Acton
 Listed buildings in Brindley
 Listed buildings in Burland
 	Listed buildings in Haughton
 Listed buildings in Henhull
 Listed buildings in Poole
 Listed buildings in Stoke
 Listed buildings in Worleston

References
Citations

Sources

 

Listed buildings in the Borough of Cheshire East
Lists of listed buildings in Cheshire